Burnie Bridge (born September 16, 1948) was an appellate judge for the District IV in the Wisconsin Court of Appeals. She was appointed in 2007, with her term set to expire on July 31, 2014. In October 2009, Bridge retired from the court effective in January 2010.

Career
Bridge began practicing law as a private attorney in 1983, but by 1985 had moved into public service as an Assistant Attorney General, a position she held through 1993. For the decade following, she served as Deputy Attorney General. Between 2003 and her 2007 appointment to the Court of Appeals, she served various positions in the public sector, including chairing Wisconsin's Public Service Commission (2003–05) and serving as administrator for the Division of Children and Family Services for the Wisconsin Department of Healthcare and Family Services (2005–2006). Bridge is a member of a number of professional boards. In 2010, Judge Bridge retired and Gary Sherman was appointed to take office.

Education
Bridge obtained her B.A. from Miami University in Ohio in 1970, graduating with her juris doctor from the University of Wisconsin Law School cum laude in 1982.

References 

Wisconsin Court of Appeals judges
Miami University alumni
University of Wisconsin Law School alumni
1948 births
Living people